Dreamsongs: A RRetrospective is a career-spanning collection of George R. R. Martin's short fiction. It was first published in 2003 as a single volume hardcover from Subterranean Press under the title GRRM: A RRetrospective and debuted in Toronto at Torcon 3, the 63rd World Science Fiction Convention, where Martin was the Writer Guest Of Honor. The collection features 34 pieces of fiction (including two TV scripts), an introduction by Gardner Dozois, commentary by Martin on each stage of his career, a Martin bibliography, and original art for each story. Subterranean published the book in three formats: a trade hardcover, a signed, numbered, and slipcased deluxe hardcover, and a very limited, deluxe leather-bound, lettered hardcover. The Washington Post called Subterranean's single-author collection "the most ambitious volume ever to come from an American specialty press".

A UK first hardcover edition (right), running to more than 1,200 pages, was published three years later, in September 2006, by Victor Gollancz Ltd. Bantam then reprinted the collection in the United States in 2007 as a two-volume trade hardcover set. Both the 2006 UK reprint and 2007 USA reprint carry the new title Dreamsongs: A RRetrospective.

Contents 

The collection is divided into nine thematic sections, with all the stories arranged in rough chronological order. The sections, and the stories they contain, are as follows:

A Four-Color Fanboy

The Filthy Pro

The Light of Distant Stars

The Heirs of Turtle Castle

Hybrids and Horrors

A Taste of Tuf 

This section features two stories in the Haviland Tuf series, about an overweight space trader encountering various civilizations.

{| class="wikitable"
|-
! # !! Title !! Year !! Note !! Previously published
|-
| 23 || "A Beast for Norn" || 1976 || Novelette || Tuf Voyaging (1986)
|-
| 24 || "Guardians" || 1981 || Novelette || Tuf Voyaging" (1986)
|}

 The Siren Song of Hollywood 

This section features two television screenplays by George R. R. Martin. The former is a script for an episode of The Twilight Zone, and the latter is a pilot for a never-made science fiction series similar to Sliders.

 Doing the Wild Card Shuffle 

This section features two of George R. R. Martin's contributions to the Wild Cards'' shared universe.

The Heart in Conflict

External links 
Official entry on Subterranean page
Announcement of British edition on author's page
Bantam page

2003 short story collections
Short story collections by George R. R. Martin
Subterranean Press books